Mangelia myrmecodes is a species of sea snail, a marine gastropod mollusk in the family Mangeliidae.

Description
The length of the shell attains 5 mm, its diameter 2.55 mm.

(Original description) The solid shell is oblong and has a pale straw color. It contains six whorls. The protoconch is nipple-shaped and slightly translucent. The other whorls show pronounced noduled ribs (11 on the body whorl). The many spiral lirae form nodules when crossing the ribs. The aperture is narrow. The sinus is wide. The outer lip is incrassate and crenulate. The columella stands upright. It is best distinguished by its noduled ribs, which are particularly well defined.

Distribution
This marine species occurs off Pakistan.

References

External links
  Tucker, J.K. 2004 Catalog of recent and fossil turrids (Mollusca: Gastropoda). Zootaxa 682:1–1295.

myrmecodes
Gastropods described in 1901